Northholm Grammar School is an independent Anglican co-educational primary and secondary day school, located in Arcadia, in the Hills District of Sydney, New South Wales, Australia.

The school was established in 1983 and is situated on 10 hectares. It currently serves students from Kindergarten to Year 12.

In March 2019, Mr Christopher Bradbury was commissioned as the fifth and current Principal of Northholm Grammar School.

Education Philosophy
Northholm Grammar's flexible academic curriculum is combined with Christian values. The school is non-selective, with a Liberal Arts (liberating the student to be an independent thinker) foundation. The Junior School (K-Year 6) curriculum has been designed with the two core elements of "Units of Enquiry" and "Subject-specific Learning Experiences" within the guidelines of the national curriculum, the Australian Curriculum. The Senior School (Years 7-12) curriculum features a broad range of subjects within the requirements of the NSW Board of Studies that allow students to tailor their studies. Students in Years 11 and 12 work towards their Higher School Certificate, with the opportunity to study TAFE vocational courses. Personalised Education Plans are in place for students requiring additional support.

Since its inception in 1983, pastoral care has been an integral part of Northholm's program which includes the House System, tutor groups, leadership programs, and specialist counsellors. Co-curricular programs available to students include Music, Drama, Art, Agriculture Clubs, Science Club and Debating. The school also offers a broad range of sports, has an Outdoor Education program for Years 7-10 and participates in the Duke of Edinburgh's International Award.

Houses

In 1983 there were three Houses at Northholm. These were Capell, Patteson and Rowland. Capell was assigned the colour red, Patteson white and Rowland blue, these being the three school colours. However, when in 1984 Lincoln House was added and given the colour green, it was decided that since tradition had already been broken Patteson could change to the more distinctive colour of yellow.

Capell 
Capell House is named after Arthur Capell (1902-1986), who attended the school opening in July 1983. Capell was a renowned Australian linguist who made major contribution to the study of several Papuan, Polynesian and Indigenous Australian languages.

Lincoln
In 1984 Lincoln was established as the fourth House at Northholm, named after His Honour Judge John Lincoln (1916-2011), Chairman of the School Council and a Judge of the District Court. He was also Deputy Chancellor of Macquarie University, Treasurer of the New South Wales Branch of the Liberal Party, Mayor of North Sydney and Chancellor of the Diocese of Newcastle.

Rowland
Rowland House is named after former Governor of New South Wales, Air Marshal Sir James Rowland (1922-1999), who formally opened the School in July 1993. Rowland was awarded an Air Force Cross, Distinguished Flying Cross and Knight Commander of the Order of the British Empire during his service in the Royal Australian Air Force, and later appointed a Companion of the Order of Australia.

Patteson
Patteson House was named after a John Coleridge Patteson (1827-1871), an English Anglican Bishop, missionary to the South Sea Islands, the first Bishop of Melanesia and accomplished linguist.

Publications

Northholm produces several publications throughout the school year, namely The Weekly Record, The Arcadian and Ilex.

The Weekly Record
The Weekly Record is Northholm's weekly news publication which is emailed to parents on Fridays. Columns include From The Principal, Important Dates, Middle Year News, and the From the Registrar among others. It features the results from Northholm's sporting teams and co-curricular achievements, as well as upcoming events.

Ilex
Ilex is Northholm's annual school yearbook that features yearly reports from all departments of the school, house reports, sports carnival summaries, co-curricular reports and photos.

Notable alumni
The following is a list of Northholm alumni who have had significant success in their chosen field:
 Matt Dunning, represented Australia in rugby union
 Casey Dunning, represented Canada in rugby union
 Julia Hargreaves, represented Australia at the 2012 Summer Olympics in equestrian jumping
 Molly Taylor, professional rally driver
 Craig Lewis, represented Australia at the 2004 Summer Olympics in baseball, coming home with a silver medal
 Hannah Dodd, dual Paralympian in wheelchair basketball and equestrian

See also 

 List of Anglican schools in New South Wales
 Sydney Anglican Schools Corporation

References

External links
 Northholm Grammar School Official Website.

Anglican primary schools in Sydney
Anglican secondary schools in Sydney
Hornsby Shire
Educational institutions established in 1983
1983 establishments in Australia
Grammar schools in Australia